The Panasonic Lumix DMC-FS5 is a compact digital camera announced by Panasonic on January 29, 2008.

Its exterior, user interface and firmware is nearly identical to that of the Panasonic Lumix DMC-FS3.

References

FS5
Live-preview digital cameras
Cameras introduced in 2008
Digital cameras with CCD image sensor